Cristian Shpendi (born 19 May 2003) is an Albanian professional footballer who plays as a forward for Italian club Cesena and the Albania national under-21 team.

Club career

Early career - Cesena
Stiven was born in Ancona, Italy along with his twin Stiven from Albanian parents originally from Pukë who were immigrants since 1997 and thus they hold dual citizenship. Their first team was Real Metauro from where they moved at Delfino Fano, then to San Marino academy until they went to Cesena. Twins in life twins also in the field of play, playing their first competitive season for Cesena under-17 squad coached by Filippo Masolini in Allievi Nazionali U17, where the attacking duo made each 16 appearances with Cristian scoring 14 goals and Stiven 11. Then playing for Cesena Primavera under coach Giovanni Ceccarelli in Campionato Primavera 3 2020–21 with "twin" appearances and goals 15 and 13 each, the duo helped the side to reach the final losing only to Arezzo Primavera. For the next season 2021–22, promoted already at Primavera 2 Cristian scored 15 goals in 17 matches and helped by 23 goals of Stiven in just 20 matches which became league top-scorer, Cesena won the Championship gaining promotion now to Primavera 1 and also won the Primavera Supercup against Udinese Primavera beating them 4–1 with 2 goals from each twin. Meanwhile they were promoted also in the first team in the 2021–22 Serie C where Cristian made his professional debut under coach William Viali on 25 September 2021 against Olbia starting and playing for 57 minutes before being replaced by Salvatore Caturano which managed to score the winning goal in the 90+4' minute with Cesena taking an away 0–1 win. On 25 February 2022 the twins extended their contract with Cesena until 2025.

International career
Shpendi was called up to the Albania national under-19 team by coach Armando Cungu for several friendlies during 2021 playing almost all matches as a starter collecting 5 appearances and scoring 2 times.

In November 2021, he was called up to participate in the 2020 UEFA European Under-19 Championship qualification Group 7 where his side were shorted to play against France, Serbia and North Macedonia. He made his competitive debut in the first match versus France substituting in at half time exactly for his twin Stiven where his side was beaten 4–0. Then for the next game against serbia 3 days later, he started from the bench and was brought in at 72nd minute with Albania U19 down to 1–0 also with Serbia scoring more 5 minutes later but Albania scoring two times in 84th minute with Henrik Nerguti and Shpendi 4 minutes later to get an important draw to keep fighting for a qualification in the next round. In the closing match against North Macedonia he came on only in the last few minutes with Albania U19 collecting a 3–1 victory to go on 4 points same as Serbia but failing to qualify due to the goal difference thus ranking in the 3rd place of the group.

Twins made their debut with Albania under-21 under coach Alban Bushi on 16 November 2022 where they got included in the starting line up.

Career statistics

Club

References

External links

2003 births
Living people
Sportspeople from Ancona
Albanian footballers
Association football forwards
Serie C players
Cesena F.C. players
Albania youth international footballers
Albania under-21 international footballers
Italian people of Albanian descent